Qurjan may refer to:
 Qurjan, Isfahan
 Qurjan, South Khorasan